Keiichi Suzuki (鈴木恵一, Suzuki Keiichi, born 21 March 1949) is a former Japanese racing driver. In 1996 and 1998 Suzuki won the GT300 class in the Japan Grand Touring Car Championship. He retired in 1999 following the death of his teammate Shingo Tachi in a testing crash at the TI Circuit and has since worked with the Hankook KTR team in Super GT.

Racing record

Complete Japanese Touring Car Championship (1994-) results

Complete JGTC Results

References

1949 births
Living people
Japanese racing drivers
24 Hours of Le Mans drivers
World Sportscar Championship drivers

Long Distance Series drivers
Japanese Sportscar Championship drivers
TOM'S drivers